Saint Theodosia may refer to:

 Theodosia of Tyre, martyred in 307 AD in Caesarea
 Theodosia of Constantinople, martyred in 729 in Constantinople